Sørreisa is a municipality in Troms og Finnmark county, Norway. The administrative centre of the municipality is the village of Sørreisa. Other villages include Grunnreisa, Skøelva, and Smørsgård.

The  municipality is the 248th largest by area out of the 356 municipalities in Norway. Sørreisa is the 218th most populous municipality in Norway with a population of 3,414.

General information
The municipality of Sørreisen was established on 1 September 1886 when the large Tranøy Municipality was divided into three:  Tranøy (population: 1,239) in the west, Dyrøy (population: 1,281) in the south, and Sørreisen (population: 1,361) in the east. Later, the spelling was changed to Sørreisa. During the 1960s, there were many municipal mergers across Norway due to the work of the Schei Committee. On 1 January 1964, the part of Sørreisa across the Reisafjorden on the island of Senja (population: 129) was transferred to Lenvik Municipality.

On 1 January 2020, the municipality became part of the newly formed Troms og Finnmark county. Previously, it had been part of the old Troms county.

Name
The municipality (originally the parish) is named after the local Reisafjorden. The fjord was named after the river Reisaelva which flows into the fjord. The river name is derived from the verb  which means "to raise" (referring to flooding). The prefix  (meaning "southern") was added to the name to distinguish the municipality from the nearby Nordreisa Municipality to the north. The municipal name was originally spelled Sørreisen, but the spelling was later changed to the present form.

Coat of arms
The coat of arms was granted on 7 September 1984. The official blazon is "Gules, three six-pointed mullets Or". This means the arms have a red field (background) and the charge is three six-pointed stars. Each star has a tincture of Or which means it is commonly colored yellow, but if it is made out of metal, then gold is used. The arms were designed by Ottar Jarl Myrvang. The design was inspired by the oldest seal preserved from Sørreisa. The seal belonged to the local politician Jacob Hansen Kinapel who was a policeman in Sørreisa from 1715 to 1748. His heptagonal 18th century seal shows his initials IHSK around three stars, an eight-pointed star in the centre over two six-pointed stars.

Churches
The Church of Norway has one parish within the municipality of Sørreisa. It is part of the Indre Troms prosti (deanery) in the Diocese of Nord-Hålogaland.

Geography
Sørreisa is located on the western coast of Norway, along the Reisafjorden, just east of the large island of Senja. The  municipality is mostly populated along the shoreline. The municipality of Dyrøy lies to the west, Salangen and Bardu to the south, Målselv to the east, and Lenvik to the north.

Climate
Sørreisa has continental subarctic climate. The Köppen Climate Classification subtype for this climate is "Dfc". The Norwegian Meteorological Institute has been operating a weather station in Sørreisa for many years.

Government
All municipalities in Norway, including Sørreisa, are responsible for primary education (through 10th grade), outpatient health services, senior citizen services, unemployment and other social services, zoning, economic development, and municipal roads. The municipality is governed by a municipal council of elected representatives, which in turn elect a mayor.  The municipality falls under the Senja District Court and the Hålogaland Court of Appeal.

Municipal council
The municipal council  of Sørreisa is made up of 19 representatives that are elected to four year terms. The party breakdown of the council is as follows:

Mayors
The mayors of Sørreisa:

 1886–1888: Jacob Moe 
 1889–1907: Johan Jørgensen 
 1908–1925: Ingvald Andersen (V)
 1926–1928: Hans Nordgård 
 1929–1940: Kristian Simonsen (Ap)
 1942–1945: Oliver Krogstad (NS)
 1945–1952: Kristian Simonsen (Ap)
 1953–1969: Thoralf Dalseth (Ap)
 1970–1982: Arnold W. Johansen (Ap)
 1982–1991: Kjell Bakkland (Ap)
 1992–1999: Paul Dahlø (Ap)
 1999–2007: Magnor Olsen (Ap)
 2007–2011: Knut H. Olsen (H)
 2011–2015: Paul Dahlø (Ap)
 2015–present: Jan-Eirik Nordahl (Ap)

Notable people 
 Amalie Øvergaard (1874 in Sørreisa – 1960) a Norwegian women's leader
 Berger Torrissen (1901 in Sørreisa – 1991) an American skier, competed in the 1936 Winter Olympics for the USA
 Willy Ovesen (1924 in Sørreisa – 2015) a Norwegian civil servant, director of the Norwegian Tax Administration from 1982 to 1994
 Herborg Finnset (born 1961 in Sørreisa) a Norwegian prelate of the Church of Norway and the Bishop of Nidaros from 2018
 Tore Rismo (born 1961 in Sørreisa) a retired Norwegian football midfielder
 Siri Pettersen (born 1971) a Norwegian writer and comics creator, brought up in Sørreisa

Gallery

References

External links
 Municipal fact sheet from Statistics Norway 
 
 
 

 
Municipalities of Troms og Finnmark
1886 establishments in Norway